Giuseppe “Pippo” Calderone (Catania, November 1, 1925 – Catania, September 8, 1978) was an influential Sicilian mafioso from Catania, eventually becoming the capo of the Catania Mafia family.

He became the ‘secretary’ of the Interprovincial Commission, formed around 1975 on his instigation. Its purpose was to coordinate the provincial Mafia commissions and avoid conflicts over public contracts that crossed provincial borders. Calderone was killed in 1978, on the orders of Totò Riina.

Early years
Originally, Catania was not a traditional Mafia area. The Mafia was much more entrenched in the western part of Sicily. According to Pippo’s brother Antonino Calderone (who became a pentito in 1987) the first Mafia family in Catania was started by Antonio Saitta. He had been prosecuted by Mussolini’s Iron Prefect, Cesare Mori. One of his daughters was the mother of Giuseppe and Antonino Calderone.

Another uncle had helped the Mafia get back on its feet after World War II, organizing the black market in contraband cigarettes. Cosa Nostra’s control in Catania is less secure than in western Sicily. Next to the Mafia there are other independent groups that are not part of the Mafia cartel: the Cursoti, the Carcagnusi and the Malpassoti. Violent disputes between the different clans are quite common.

In the early 1960s, Calderone was already a man of honor and had the role of consigliere within the Catania mafia, which at the time was headed by Orazio Nicotra. In the mid-1960s, Giuseppe becomes the capo of the Catania's mafia family.

Initially, the Catania's mafia family headed by Calderone went through difficult times economically. They earned some money with cigarette smuggling and ran an Agip petrol station, thanks to a franchise they acquired through Christian Democrat politician Graziano Verzotto. Giuseppe Calderone and senator Graziano Verzotto were the best man at the marriage of the Mafia boss from Riesi in the province of Caltanissetta, Giuseppe Di Cristina.

In the beginning of the 1970s, the Calderone clan developed a relationship with the construction entrepreneur Carmelo Costanzo – one of the four Cavalieri del Lavoro (Knights of Labour), together with Francesco Finocchiaro, Mario Rendo and Gaetano Graci – who needed the mafiosi for protection. Construction sites of rival companies were bombed and at least one rival of Costanzo was assassinated. They made sure there would be no problems for Costanzo’s companies when they worked elsewhere in Sicily.

At the top in Cosa Nostra
Giuseppe Calderone became one of the leaders of Cosa Nostra. He established good relationships with the Mafia families from Palermo. On June 17, 1970 the traffic police in Milan stopped an Alfa Romeo for speeding. In the car were Tommaso Buscetta, Salvatore "Ciaschiteddu" Greco, Gerlando Alberti, Gaetano Badalamenti and Giuseppe Calderone. Unaware of the identity of the men in the car the police let them continue their journey.

The mafiosi were involved in a series of meetings about the future of Cosa Nostra. They decided to set up a new Sicilian Mafia Commission (the first one was dissolved after the Ciaculli massacre) – initially headed by a triumvirate consisting of Gaetano Badalamenti, Stefano Bontade and the Corleonesi boss Luciano Leggio.

At the time, Calderone was also involved in the negotiations between Cosa Nostra and prince Junio Valerio Borghese who asked for support for his plans for a neo-fascist coup in return for a pardon of convicted mafiosi like Vincenzo Rimi and Luciano Leggio. According to Mafia turncoat Tommaso Buscetta the prince Borghese wanted a list with all mafiosi of Sicily. Calderone and Giuseppe Di Cristina went to Rome and met the prince Borghese. They told Borghese they wouldn’t give him any list and also asked him to manage the trials they were interested in. However, the Mafia decided not to participate and the so-called Golpe Borghese fizzled out in the night of December 8, 1970.

According to reports, Calderone was the godfather in the baptism of one of the sons of Ciro Mazzarella, an important Camorra boss and at the time the head of the Mazzarella clan.

Interprovincial Commission
In February 1975 an Interprovincial Commission was formed on the instigation of Giuseppe Calderone who became its first "secretary". It was meant to coordinate the provincial Mafia commissions and avoid conflicts over business interests such as public works contracts that crossed provincial borders. The other members were Gaetano Badalamenti for Palermo, Giuseppe Settecasi (Agrigento), Cola Buccellato (Trapani), Angelo Mongiovì (Enna) and Giuseppe Di Cristina (Caltanissetta).

While Calderone was elevated to the Commission his underboss Nitto Santapaola took over the business in Catania for the Mafia family. He managed the interests in heroin trafficking and acted as chief enforcer for the leading businessmen. Meanwhile, Santapaola carefully built a private faction within the family that was loyal to him – and strengthened relations with Riina and the Corleonesi. While Riina was a fugitive he frequently spent time in and around Catania and often went hunting with Santapaola around the local mountains.

At war with the Corleonesi
Calderone and Di Cristina became early targets of Totò Riina and Bernardo Provenzano and their Corleonesi in their attempt to dominate the Sicilian Mafia. The Corleonesi were attacking the allies of the Palermo families in the other provinces to isolate men like Stefano Bontade, Salvatore Inzerillo and Gaetano Badalamenti. 

Calderone and Di Cristina recognised the danger. Calderone was challenged by Nitto Santapaola in Catania, while Francesco Madonia, not to be confused with his relative Francesco "Ciccio" Madonia, wanted to eliminate Di Cristina in the province of Caltanissetta. On November 21, 1977, Di Cristina survived a shooting, but his most loyal men Giuseppe Di Fede and Carlo Napolitano were murdered by the Corleonesi. Madonia was suspected to be behind the attack.

In January 1978, Salvatore "Ciaschiteddu" Greco, the old and ailing former head of the Sicilian Mafia Commission, came all the way from Venezuela to try to restrain Calderone, Di Cristina, Gaetano Badalamenti and Salvatore Inzerillo from retaliating against the growing power of the Corleonesi. Di Cristina and Badalamenti wanted to kill Francesco Madonia, the boss of Vallelunga Mafia family and an ally of the Corleonesi in the province of Caltanissetta. Greco tried to convince them not to go ahead and offered Di Cristina to emigrate to Venezuela. 

Nevertheless, Calderone, Badalamenti and Di Cristina decided to go on and Francesco Madonia was murdered on April 8, 1978, by Di Cristina and Salvatore Pillera (from Catania, who was dispatched by Calderone). In retaliation, Di Cristina was killed in May 1978 by the Corleonesi. Next was Giuseppe Calderone, who was killed on September 8, 1978. His rival Nitto Santapaola – who had forged an alliance with the Corleonesi – took over the command of the Catania Mafia Family. These killings were just a prelude to the Second Mafia War that really started after the murder of Stefano Bontade in 1981.

One of the more bizarre anecdotes Calderone's brother Antonio Calderone  (who became a state witness in 1987) related in his memoirs was that of Riina giving an impassioned eulogy of Pippo Calderone as a great peacemaker at the funeral that reduced many hardened mafiosi to tears, even though they knew that Riina himself probably had ordered the killing.

References

Arlacchi, Pino & Antonio Calderone (1992). Men of Dishonor. Inside the Sicilian Mafia. An Account of Antonio Calderone, New York: William Morrow & Co.
 Caruso, Alfio (2000). Da cosa nasce cosa. Storia della mafia del 1943 a oggi, Milan: Longanesi 
Servadio, Gaia (1976), Mafioso. A history of the Mafia from its origins to the present day, London: Secker & Warburg 
Stille, Alexander (1995). Excellent Cadavers. The Mafia and the Death of the First Italian Republic, New York: Vintage 

1925 births
1978 deaths
Sicilian mafiosi
Sicilian Mafia Commission
Mafiosi murdered by the Corleonesi
People from Catania
People murdered in Italy